The City of Florence is a Statutory City located in Fremont County, Colorado, United States. The city population was 3,822 at the 2020 United States Census. Florence is a part of the Cañon City, CO Micropolitan Statistical Area and the Front Range Urban Corridor.

History
Florence was built as a transportation center, with three railroads including a small railroad depot for the trains that hauled coal from the neighboring towns of Rockvale and Coal Creek. After a small oil was discovered north of Canon City at Oil Spring, commercial quantity oil was discovered in Florence in 1862,  Florence became the first significant oil center west of the Mississippi. In the early 1880s the town grew rapidly. The city was named after Florence, the daughter of local settler James McCandless. The town was incorporated in 1887.

The Downtown Florence Historic District was listed on the National Register of Historic Places in 2017.

Geography
Florence is in eastern Fremont County, on the south side of the Arkansas River. Colorado State Highway 115 runs northwest  to Cañon City and northeast  to Penrose, intersecting U.S. Route 50 in each direction. Colorado State Highway 67 leads north  to US 50 and south  to Wetmore.

At the 2020 United States Census, the town had a total area of  including  of water.

Florence sits in the semi-arid high desert lands of southern Colorado.

Demographics

As of the census of 2000, there were 3,653 people, 1,488 households, and 973 families residing in the city. The racial makeup of the city was 92.77% White, 0.30% African American, 1.23% Native American, 0.30% Asian, 2.63% from other races, and 2.76% from two or more races. Hispanic or Latino of any race were 15.66% of the population.

There were 1,488 households, out of which 31.8% had children under the age of 18 living with them, 49.4% were married couples living together, 11.6% had a female householder with no husband present, and 34.6% were non-families. 30.8% of all households were made up of individuals, and 13.8% had someone living alone who was 65 years of age or older. The average household size was 2.43 and the average family size was 3.03.

In the city, the population was spread out, with 27.5% under the age of 18, 7.0% from 18 to 24, 27.9% from 25 to 44, 21.2% from 45 to 64, and 16.5% who were 65 years of age or older. The median age was 36 years. For every 100 females, there were 92.0 males. For every 100 females age 18 and over, there were 86.8 males.

The median income for a household in the city was $29,628, and the median income for a family was $39,276. Males had a median income of $33,750 versus $22,042 for females. The per capita income for the city was $14,969. About 12.5% of families and 17.6% of the population were below the poverty line, including 23.0% of those under age 18 and 11.3% of those age 65 or over.

Government
Federal Correctional Complex, Florence, including USP Florence ADMAX, the only federal supermax prison in the United States, is located near Florence in unincorporated Fremont County.

Education
Fremont RE-2 School District operates public schools, including Penrose Elementary School, Florence Elementary School and Florence Junior/Senior High School.

Notable people
 Thyra Thomson, Wyoming Secretary of State

See also

Colorado
Bibliography of Colorado
Index of Colorado-related articles
Outline of Colorado
List of counties in Colorado
List of municipalities in Colorado
List of places in Colorado
List of statistical areas in Colorado
Front Range Urban Corridor
South Central Colorado Urban Area
Cañon City, CO Micropolitan Statistical Area

References

External links
City of Florence website
CDOT map of the City of Florence
Florence Chamber of Commerce

Cities in Fremont County, Colorado
Cities in Colorado
Colorado populated places on the Arkansas River
1887 establishments in Colorado